John D. McIver Farm is a historic home and farm located near Sanford, Lee County, North Carolina. The farmhouse was built about 1855, and is a two-story, weatherboarded, mortise-and-tenon frame I-house with Greek Revival style design elements.  It sits on a brick and brownstone foundation, has exterior gable-end brick chimneys, an integral one-story-ell, and later additions. Also on the property are the contributing meat house (c. 1855), well no. 1 (c. 1855), wooden gate posts and fence (mid-19th century), and corn crib (mid-19th century).

It was listed on the National Register of Historic Places in 1993.

References

Farms on the National Register of Historic Places in North Carolina
Greek Revival houses in North Carolina
Houses completed in 1855
Buildings and structures in Lee County, North Carolina
National Register of Historic Places in Lee County, North Carolina